Muhittin Böcek (born 25 October 1962) is a Turkish politician from the Republican People's Party serving as the mayor of Antalya since 8 April 2019. He served as the mayor of Konyaaltı, a district of Antalya, from 1999 to 2019.

Personal life 
He has a son.

He caught coronavirus during the COVID-19 pandemic and was taken to the intensive care unit on 8 September 2020, he was taken from the intensive care unit out at the end of 64 days.

References 

1962 births
Living people

Motherland Party (Turkey) politicians
Republican People's Party (Turkey) politicians
Mayors of Antalya